The March 1997 tornado outbreak was a major tornado outbreak that struck portions of the central and southern United States on March 1–2, 1997. Affecting areas mostly from Arkansas to Kentucky, the outbreak produced 58 tornadoes, including three violent (F4) tornadoes, and killed at least 27 people, including 25 in Arkansas alone and one death each in Mississippi and Tennessee.  This was Arkansas' deadliest tornado outbreak since May 15, 1968, when 34 were killed in Jonesboro. Severe flooding also occurred across the Ohio and Tennessee Valleys, resulting in 16 Ohio counties and 44 Kentucky counties being declared disaster areas. The flash floods and damaging wind elsewhere caused 34 deaths across six states including 19 in Kentucky, five in Ohio, five in Tennessee, two in Texas and three in West Virginia. Damage estimates were about $1 billion (1997 USD) while 75,000 homes were damaged.

Meteorological synopsis
On March 1, 1997, very unstable air invaded much of the affected area while much warmer temperatures were recorded. Temperatures across most of Arkansas which normally at that time are below  reached the mid to upper 70s °F (24 °C). A cold front was approaching from the Midwestern Plains and was associated with a strong low further north. Strong temperature contrasts were observed on either side of the front. In addition, winds near the ground and aloft were very strong and significant shear was noted before given additional ingredients for extreme severe weather across the Mississippi and Tennessee Valleys on March 1, 1997. On February 28, 1997, the Storm Prediction Center (SPC) had issued a Day 2 moderate risk of severe weather for much of Arkansas and a tornado watch was issued for the western and central part of the state during the morning hours of March 1. Early on March 1, the SPC issued a tornado watch for portions of the Mississippi and Tennessee Valleys. Throughout the day, the National Weather Service office in Little Rock, Arkansas, issued 57 weather warnings, including 34 tornado warnings. Areas affected by the deadly tornadoes had tornado warnings with lead time estimated at between nine and 28 minutes.

Confirmed tornadoes

February 28 event

March 1 event

Notable tornadoes
The most significant and deadliest tornadoes recorded in the state were two F4s that were also the deadliest tornadoes of the outbreak. The tornadoes affected parts of Clark, Hot Spring, Saline and Pulaski counties, killing a total of 21 people. These tornadoes were accompanied by satellite tornadoes during portions of their lives, which caused additional damage in the Vimy Ridge and College Station areas, but they did not cause any additional fatalities. The two F4 tornadoes were produced by the same supercell thunderstorm that traveled through most of the state. The supercell alone killed 21 and injured several hundred others. Near the Tennessee border and across the Mississippi River, the same supercell produced three additional tornadoes, one of which killed a person near Dyersburg, Tennessee.

Another supercell north of the main storm produced several tornadoes north of Little Rock and Jonesboro. Among the towns affected was Marmaduke, which was also affected by an F3 tornado during the April 2, 2006 tornado outbreak.

Aftermath

11 counties across Arkansas were declared federal disaster areas by then-US President Bill Clinton for tornadoes while two others in were for flooding. Seven other counties in Tennessee were also declared disaster areas due to tornadoes. It was considered the worst tornado outbreak since the Palm Sunday tornado outbreak of 1994, which killed 42 across Alabama and Georgia. In Kentucky, then-governor Paul E. Patton had initially declared 120 counties a state of emergency and deployed about 1100 National Guard troops to the flood-stricken regions. In Indiana, the Ohio River overflow its banks due to record rains. All 13 counties along the river between Evansville and Cincinnati were also declared disaster areas. In West Virginia, then-Governor Cecil Underwood declared state of emergencies for 14 counties, and 16 were later declared disaster areas as over 4,000 homes and other structures were damaged by the flooding.

Overall, across the state of Arkansas 1,200 homes were damaged or destroyed, including close to 400 in Arkadelphia alone. Several areas that were hit by the tornadoes did not have any tornado sirens. After the outbreak several million dollars were invested to improve the siren system throughout the state for future tornado outbreaks, including the 2008 Super Tuesday tornado outbreak, a similar but much deadlier and more widespread outbreak. 14 people in Arkansas were killed by that outbreak on February 5, 2008, and nearly 60 in total were killed across the Mid-South regions of the US.

See also
 List of North American tornadoes and tornado outbreaks
 List of tornadoes with confirmed satellite tornadoes

References

External links
 Event Summary from NWS Little Rock
 NWS Memphis Event Summary
 Arkansas Online News Article of Arkadelphia tornado
 NOAA Service Assessment of the outbreak
 USA Today Flood and Tornado page
 Map of the 1997 Arkansas tornado outbreak Tornado History Project

1997 in Arkansas
Tornadoes of 1997
F4 tornadoes by date
Tornadoes in Arkansas
Tornadoes in Kentucky
Tornadoes in Mississippi
Tornadoes in Tennessee
1997 natural disasters in the United States
Tornado outbreak